Civic Tower may refer to

 Civic Tower (Lagos)
 Civic Tower (Pavia)
 Civic Tower (Portland, Oregon)
 Civic Tower (Varese)